The Chinese Medical Journal is an official publication of the Chinese Medical Association, co-published by Chinese Medical Association Publishing House and Wolters Kluwer Medknow. The journal publishes peer-reviewed English-language articles, covering technical and clinical studies related to health, as well as ethical and social issues in medical research.

History 
The China Medical Missionary Association was established in Shanghai in 1887. It started publishing The China Medical Missionary Journal the following year. The association was renamed later as the Chinese Medical Association and in 1932 merged into the National Medical Association of China. The China Medical Missionary Journal then merged into the English part of the National Medical Journal of China to become the Chinese Medical Journal.

Abstracting and indexing 
The journal is abstracted and indexed in:

According to the Journal Citation Reports, the journal has a 2011 impact factor of 0.864. Its 2013 Impact Factor is 1.016.

References

External links 

 Chinese Medical Association

General medical journals
Biweekly journals
Publications established in 1887
English-language journals
Academic journals published by learned and professional societies
Medknow Publications academic journals